Kulhudhuffushi Airport is an airport located on the city of Kulhudhuffushi in Haa Dhaalu Atoll, Maldives. The airport opened on 9 August 2019.

Facilities

Airlines and destinations

References

External links
 
 

Airports in the Maldives
Airports established in 2019
2019 establishments in the Maldives